Cherrie's tanager (Ramphocelus passerinii costaricensis) is a medium-sized passerine bird. This tanager is a resident breeder in the Pacific lowlands of Costa Rica and western Panama. This bird was formerly known as the scarlet-rumped tanager, but was split as a separate species from the Caribbean form, which was itself renamed as Passerini's tanager, Ramphocelus passerinii. While most authorities had accepted this split, there were notable exceptions (e.g. the Howard and Moore checklist). It was lumped back into the Scarlet-rumped Tanager in 2018.

The preferred habitat is semi-open areas including light second growth, woodland edges, gardens and pasture with bushes. The normal clutch is two pale blue or grey eggs, marked with black, brown or lilac. This species will sometimes raise two broods in a season.

The adult male is mainly black except for a scarlet rump, silvery bill and dark red iris. The female has a grey head, olive upperparts, orange rump, brownish wings and tail, and ochre underparts with a broad orange breast band. The female plumage is the one that differs most from Passerini's tanager. Immatures resemble the adult female, but with a less orange breast.

Cherrie's tanagers occur in pairs, small groups, or as part of a mixed-species feeding flock, and up to a dozen birds may roost together in dense thickets at night. This species feeds on small fruit, usually swallowed whole, insects and spiders.

Cherrie's tanager's call is a sharp wac. Its song consists of a few clear pleasant notes, delivered in longer phrases than that of its Caribbean relative.

This bird is called Cherrie's tanager to honor the memory of American naturalist, explorer and adventurer George Cherrie. Dr. Cherrie accompanied former President Theodore Roosevelt in the famous 1913 exploration of the River of Doubt, in the Brazilian amazon basin, which was later named Rio Roosevelt.

References

 Stiles and Skutch, A Guide to the Birds of Costa Rica

External links

 
 
 
 
 

Cherrie's tanager
Birds of Costa Rica
Birds of Panama
Cherrie's tanager
Cherrie's tanager
Isthmian–Pacific moist forests